Tom Principato (born 1952) is an American electric blues and blues rock singer, guitarist, and songwriter.

Principato has recorded more than twenty albums over the years. One of his most recent releases, Robert Johnson Told Me So (2013), featured keyboard work by Chuck Leavell. Pat Metheny stated of Principato that "he has an enormous talent at telling stories in his solos; he doesn't play 'standard' licks."

Life and career
Principato was born in Washington, D.C., and was initially inspired by the music of Roy Buchanan, Chet Atkins, and Danny Gatton.  However, a life changing moment occurred when he was still a teenager. Principato remembered "seeing B.B. King for three shows a night, three nights in a row, in 1969 at The Cellar Door club. I was 17 years old, still in high school, and still developing my guitar and music skills." Principato led the band Powerhouse in the late 1970s, which released Night Life to some acclaim. He joined the touring Geoff Muldaur in 1980, and recorded an album, I Ain't Drunk, as part of the ensemble known as Geoff Muldaur and His Bad Feet. He followed this by operating as a session musician, playing both in the studio and in concert with musicians including Sunnyland Slim, Billy Price, Big Mama Thornton, and James Montgomery.  Joining the Assassins with Jimmy Thackery, he recorded two albums, No Previous Record (1986) and Partners In Crime (1987). The latter recording earned Principato his first Washington Area Music Awards (Wammys).

By the mid-1980s, Principato commenced his solo career, recording the live album, Blazing Telecasters, with Danny Gatton.  It was eventually released in 1990. It was considered for a Grammy Award nomination. In 1988, Principato appeared at the Notodden Blues Festival.

From that time onwards, Principato has recorded a string of solo albums, which have seen him accompanied by an ever changing backing ensemble. These include Smokin'  (1985), I Know What You're Thinkin'... (1989), In Orbit (1991), Tip of the Iceberg (1992), In the Clouds (1995), and Really Blue (1998). Tip of the Iceberg was co-produced by Chuck Leavell, who had also performed on Really Blue. In 1995, Principato's song "In The Clouds" was also considered for nominating for a Grammy.

Fingers on Fire (2002) was originally recorded in 1978 with Pete Kennedy (now with The Kennedys), and was followed by more solo work on House on Fire (2003), Guitar Gumbo (2005), and Raising the Roof! (2008). The latter album gained Principato another Wammy in 2009. In July 2011, Principato and his band performed at the Montreux Jazz Festival.

His album, Robert Johnson Told Me So, was launched at the Bethesda Blues & Jazz Supper Club on November 16, 2013.

Bibliography
In 2000, Principato's book, Open-String Guitar Chords, was published by the Hal Leonard Corporation.
In 2020, Principato's book of memoirs They Tell Me I Had A Good Time was published by Powerhouse Records.

Awards
Principato has collected more than twenty Washington Area Music Awards (Wammys).

Endorsements
Since the 1990s, Principato has had endorsement deals with Fender, Seymour Duncan pick ups, Curt Mangan strings, and Roger Mayer guitar effects pedals.

Present day
Currently living in Falls Church, Virginia, he regularly tours across North America plus Europe, and continues to self-release records.

Discography

Albums

See also
List of blues rock musicians
List of electric blues musicians
Music of Washington, D.C.

References

External links
Official website

1952 births
Living people
American blues singers
Electric blues musicians
American blues guitarists
American male guitarists
Blues rock musicians
Songwriters from Washington, D.C.
American male songwriters
Singers from Washington, D.C.
Guitarists from Washington, D.C.
20th-century American guitarists
20th-century American male musicians